Charles Richmond Adams, known as "Bucky" Adams (April 25, 1937 - July 13, 2012) was a Canadian jazz and blues tenor saxophonist with a musical career spanning over 60 years. Throughout his long career, Adams shared the stage with or performed for notables like Queen Elizabeth II, B.B. King, Louis Armstrong, Dizzy Gillespie, Count Basie, Lionel Hampton, Oscar Peterson, and Rosa Parks. At the time of his death in Halifax, Nova Scotia, Adams was a longtime fixture of the jazz scene in eastern Canada.

Early life 
Charles Richmond "Bucky" Adams was born in Halifax, Nova Scotia on April 25, 1937, he was the son of the late Charles Augustus Adams and Susie Bertha Adams.

When he was a young boy, Adams, who was nurtured in a musical family on Maynard Street in Halifax, Nova Scotia, started playing the trumpet to accompany his father, who played the saxophone.

At the age of 9 years old, Bucky's first job was playing trumpet for a Barnum and Bailey Circus parade on the Halifax Common. He gave a performance for Queen Elizabeth II when she visited Canada in 1948 when he was just 11 years old.

During one of his regular performances at the Gerrish Street Hall in his hometown of Halifax, a young Bucky Adams played his trumpet so passionately that it physically broke. Bucky sprinted home to retrieve his father's saxophone and came back in time to take the stage once more. He fell in love with the tenor saxophone as a result, which he continued to play throughout his career.

Career 
Adams started leading his own bands while playing saxophone in the 1950s and continued to do so until the 1980s, rising to the position of respected bandleader. Rockin' Rebels, The Unusuals, Generations, and Basin Street Trio are just a few of the successful bands he established.

Basin Street Trio, a band that was established in 1975, performed at the Privateers Warehouse on Halifax Harbour's waterfront. Their first record, Bucky Adams & Basin Street: At Privateers' Warehouse, which was recorded at Solar Audio in Dartmouth, Nova Scotia, would be released in 1976.

Over the course of his extensive career, Adams performed alongside or for notable musicians including B.B. King, Louis Armstrong, Oscar Peterson, Dizzy Gillespie, Lionel Hampton, and Count Basie.

Bucky Adams began volunteering at the Harbourview Lounge in Halifax's Northwood Centre in the early 1990s, and in 1993 he started working with the Nova Scotia Mass Choir. Bucky also established himself as a regular performer at the annual Halifax Jazz Festival.

With the exception of one song, Bucky created or co-wrote all the tracks on his 1996 album, "In a Lovin' Way." The album received two East Coast Music Award nominations upon its 1997 release.

During Dr. Rosa Parks' visit to Halifax in 1998 to receive an honorary doctorate from Mount Saint Vincent University, he gave a performance for her.

Death 
Charles "Bucky" Adams died on July 13, 2012, in Halifax, Nova Scotia, Canada at the age of 75 years old.

Honors and awards 

 Recipient of the International Gabriel Award in 1981.
 Nominated for two East Coast Music Awards in 1997.
 Recipient of the "Pioneer" Award from the African Nova Scotia Music Association in November of 1998.
 Recipient of the 2007 Lifetime Achievement Award from the African Nova Scotia Music Association.
 Recipient of the Queen Elizabeth II Diamond Jubilee Medal in 2012.
 The African Canadian Recording of the Year Award was renamed the Bucky Adams Memorial Award by The East Coast Music Awards and the African Nova Scotian Music Association.

References 

Black Nova Scotians
Jazz musicians
Canadian jazz saxophonists
Canadian male jazz musicians
Jazz bandleaders